The Trisandya (from Sanskrit त्रिसन्ध्या पूज​, Trisandhyā Puja, "three-cusp prayer") is a commonly-used prayer in Indian Hinduism and Balinese Hinduism. It is uttered three times each day: 6 am at morning, noon, and 6 pm at evening, in line with the Sandhyavandanam tradition.

The Puja Tri Sandhya is the call to prayer.

Mantram Tri Sandhyā
Mantram Tri Sandhyā

Part I 
The first part of this mantra was derived from the Gayatri Mantra.

Oṁ, Oṁ, Oṁ

Bhūr bhuvaḥ svaḥ
Tat savitur vareṇyaṃ
Bhargo devasya dhīmahi
Dhiyo yo naḥ pracodayāt

OM is the Earth, Sky, and the Heavens.
Let us meditate on the light of the Sun
and may our thoughts be
inspired by that divine light.

Part II 

Oṁ Nārāyaṇa evedaṁ Sarvām
Yad bhūtaṁ yac ca bhavyam
Niṣkalaṅko nirañjano nirvikalpo
Nirākhyātaḥ śudho deva eko
Nārāyaṇaḥ na dvitīyo asti kaścit

OM, Narayana is all that has been and what will be,
free from taint, free from dirt,
ever existing and without form,
Holy God Narayana,
He is the only one and there is no other.

Part III 

Oṁ tvaṁ Śivas tvaṁ Mahādevaḥ
Īśvaraḥ Parameśvaraḥ
Brahmā Viṣṇuś ca Rudraś ca
Puruṣaḥ Parikīrtitāḥ

OM, You are Shiva, You are the Great God;
You are Ishvara, Parameshvara;
You are Brahma, Vishnu, and Rudra;
You are Purusha, the supreme soul, and the source of everything.

Part IV 

Oṁ Pāpo ’haṁ pāpakarmāhaṁ
Pāpātmā pāpasaṁbhavaḥ
Trāhi māṁ puṅḍarikākṣaā
Sabāhyā bhyāntaraḥ śuciḥ

OM, I am full of sin, my action is sinful,
I myself am sinful, and my birth is sinful,
save me, O Lotus-Eyed One,
purify my body and mind.

Part V 

Oṁ Kṣamasva mām Mahādevaḥ
Sarvāprāṅi hitāṅkaraḥ
Mām moca Sarvā pāpebhyaḥ
Pālayasva sadāśiva

OM, forgive me, Great God,
You who give salvation to all sentient beings,
save me from my sins
and protect me, O Sada Shiva.

Part VI 

Oṁ Kṣantavyaḥ kāyiko doṣāḥ
Kṣantavyo vāciko mama
Kṣantavyo mānaso doṣaḥ tat
Pramādāt Kṣamasva mām

OM, forgive my wrong actions,
forgive my wrong speech,
forgive my sinful mind,
forgive me for all of my misdeeds.

Part VII 

Oṁ, Śāntiḥ, Śāntiḥ, Śāntiḥ, Oṁ

OM, may there be peace, peace, peace, OM

See also 
 Shaivism

References

External links 

 A video of the Trisandya Mantra with an English translation (YouTube)
 Babad Bali – Tri Sandhya

Hinduism in Indonesia
Hindu mantras